Viva Macau served the following destinations (at March 2010):

Asia

East Asia
Japan
Sapporo - New Chitose Airport
Tokyo - Narita International Airport [charter]
Macau
Macau International Airport Base

Southeast Asia
Indonesia
Jakarta - Soekarno-Hatta International Airport
Vietnam
Hanoi - Noi Bai International Airport
Ho Chi Minh City - Tan Son Nhat International Airport

Oceania
Australia
Melbourne - Melbourne Airport

Terminated destinations

Asia
East Asia
South Korea – Busan, Muan

South Asia
Maldives – Malé

Southeast Asia
Thailand – Phuket
Vietnam – Haiphong

Oceania
Australia – Sydney

References

Lists of airline destinations